Kit may refer to:

Places
Kitt, Indiana, US, formerly Kit
 Kit, Iran, a village in Mazandaran Province
 Kit Hill, Cornwall, England

People
 Kit (given name), a list of people and fictional characters
 Kit (surname)

Animals
 Young animals:
 A short form of kitten, a young cat
 A young beaver
 A young ferret
 A young fox 
 A young mink
 A young rabbit
 A young raccoon
 A young skunk
 A young squirrel
 A young wolverine
 Old collective noun for a group of pigeons flying together

Kinds of sets
 Standard equipment and attire in sports:
 Kit (association football)
 Kit (cycling)
 Kit (rugby football)
 Kit (of components), a set of components such as
 Electronic kit
 Kit car or component car
Testing kit (disambiguation)

Other uses
 Kit lens, a low-end SLR camera lens
 Kit violin or kit, a small stringed musical instrument
 Tropical Storm Kit, tropical cyclones named Kit
 Whale (film), 1970, Bulgarian title

See also
 
 
 KIT (disambiguation)
 Kits (disambiguation)
 St. Kitts, an island in the Caribbean Sea